DNA replication licensing factor MCM6 is a protein that in humans is encoded by the MCM6 gene. MCM6 is one of the highly conserved mini-chromosome maintenance proteins (MCM) that are essential for the initiation of eukaryotic genome replication.

Function 

The MCM complex consisting of MCM6 (this protein) and MCM2, 4 and 7 possesses DNA helicase activity, and may act as a DNA unwinding enzyme.  The hexameric protein complex formed by the MCM proteins is a key component of the pre-replication complex (pre-RC) and may be involved in the formation of replication forks and in the recruitment of other DNA replication related proteins.  The phosphorylation of the complex by CDC2 kinase reduces the helicase activity, suggesting a role in the regulation of DNA replication. Mcm 6 has recently been shown to interact strongly Cdt1 at defined residues, by mutating these target residues Wei et al. observed lack of Cdt1 recruitment of Mcm2-7 to the pre-RC.

Gene 

The MCM6 gene, MCM6, is expressed at very high level. MCM6 contains 18 introns. There are 2 non overlapping alternative last exons. The transcripts appear to differ by truncation of the 3' end, presence or absence of 2 cassette exons, common exons with different boundaries.

MCM6 produces, by alternative splicing, 3 different transcripts, all with introns, putatively encoding 3 different protein isoforms.

MCM6 contains two of the regulatory regions for LCT, the gene encoding the protein lactase, located in two of the MCM6 introns, approximately 14 kb and 22 kb upstream of LCT. A substitution of thymine for cytosine in the first region (at -13910), in particular, has been shown to function in vitro as an enhancer element capable of differentially activating transcription of LCT promoter.

Mutations in these regions are associated with lactose tolerance into adult life. " Two variants were associated with lactase persistence..."

Interactions 

MCM6 has been shown to interact with:

 CDC45-related protein,
 MCM2, 
 MCM4, 
 MCM7, 
 ORC1L, 
 ORC2L, 
 ORC4L,  and
 Replication protein A1.

See also 
Mini Chromosome Maintenance

References

Further reading 

 
 
 
 
 
 
 
 
 
 
 
 
 
 
 
 
 
 

Proteins